Current Genomics is a peer-reviewed scientific journal covering all aspects of genomics. It was established in 2000 with Stefan M. Pulst as founding editor-in-chief and is  published by Bentham Science Publishers. 
The editor-in-chief is Christian Néri (INSERM).

Abstracting and indexing 
The journal is abstracted and indexed in:

According to the Journal Citation Reports, the journal has a 2019 impact factor of 2.630.

References

External links 

Bentham Science Publishers academic journals
Publications established in 2001
English-language journals
Genetics journals
Genomics journals